Mark Miller may refer to:

Entertainment
 Mark D. Miller (1891–1970), Colorado photographer
 Mark Miller (actor) (1924–2022), television actor and producer, father of Penelope Ann Miller
 Mark Thomas Miller (born 1960), actor in the short-lived Misfits of Science TV series
 Mark Miller (musician), lead singer of the band Sawyer Brown
 Mark Alan Miller, vice president of Seraphim, comic book writer

Sports
 Mark Miller (American football) (born 1956), American football quarterback
 Mark Miller (footballer) (born 1962), retired English football player and coach
 Mark Miller (racer) (born 1962), off-road racer, competing in both cars and on motorcycles
 Mark Miller (soccer) (born 1962), minor league U.S. soccer player
 Mark Miller (kickboxer) (born 1971), American kickboxer
 Mark Miller (basketball) (born 1975), American basketball player and coach
 Mark Miller (fighter) (born 1978), professional mixed martial artist
 Mark Miller (TT motorcyclist), American motorcycle racer
 Justin Miller (baseball, born 1977) full name: Justin Mark Miller (August 27, 1977 – June 26, 2013)

Others
Mark F. Miller (born 1943), Wisconsin state senator
Mark Miller (Ohio), lawyer and librarian from Ohio, ran for Congress, 1992
Mark Crispin Miller (born 1949), conspiracy theorist and professor of media studies at New York University
Mark S. Miller, computer scientist, inventor of Miller Columns and the E programming language
Mark Miller (died 2015), life partner of the actor George Nader
Mark Miller (Manitoba politician) - Councillor elected in the 1989 Winnipeg municipal election

See also
Mark Millar (born 1969), Scottish comic book writer
Mark Millar (footballer) (born 1988), Scottish footballer
Marc Miller (disambiguation)